Gavin Creedon (born 2001) is an Irish Gaelic footballer who plays at club level with KIlshannig and at inter-county level with the Cork senior football team. He usually lines out as a goalkeeper.

Career

Creedon played Gaelic football at juvenile and underage levels with the Kilshannig club. He eventually progressed onto the club's top adult team in the Cork IAFC. Creedon first lined out at inter-county level with the Cork under-20 football team, with whom he won a Munster U20 Championship title in 2021. He joined the Cork senior football team as a member of the extended training panel in 2020.

Career statistics

Honours

Kilshannig
Cork Intermediate A Football Championship: 2022

References

External link
Gavin Creedon profile at the Cork GAA website

2001 births
Living people
Kilshannig Gaelic footballers
UCC Gaelic footballers
Cork inter-county Gaelic footballers
Gaelic football goalkeepers